Kevin Joseph Zegers (born September 19, 1984) is a Canadian actor and model. He is known for his roles as Josh Framm in the Air Bud film series, Toby Osbourne in Transamerica (2005), Damien Dalgaard in the CW teen drama Gossip Girl, and as rookie FBI Agent Brendon Acres on the  ABC crime drama The Rookie: Feds. He has also starred in the films Dawn of the Dead (2004), It's a Boy Girl Thing (2006), The Jane Austen Book Club (2007), Fifty Dead Men Walking (2008), Frozen (2010), The Mortal Instruments: City of Bones, and Nighthawks (2019).

Early life
Zegers was born in Woodstock, Ontario, the son of Mary-Ellen (née Veldman), a teacher, and Jim Zegers, a quarry worker. He has two sisters, Krista and Katie. (The latter is also an actress; she appeared with him in John Carpenter's In the Mouth of Madness.) He is of Dutch descent; all four of his grandparents were born in the Netherlands. He attended St Mary's Catholic High School in Woodstock.

Zegers is active in sports, especially basketball, ice hockey, and golf. He played on the Hollywood Knights celebrity basketball team, raising money for local Los Angeles schools.

Career

Early work
Zegers began his performing career at the age of six, appearing in about 30 TV commercials. His first film role was at the age of seven, in a small part in the Michael J. Fox comedy Life with Mikey (1993), playing a younger version of Fox's character. Subsequently, he made a guest appearance on the acclaimed science fiction series The X-Files, playing a stigmatic child, Kevin Kryder, in the 1995 episode "Revelations," and had a recurring role on the Canadian TV series Traders (1996). During this time, he appeared in several made-for-television films, including Thicker Than Blood: The Larry McLinden Story, The Silence of Adultery, and Rose Hill, and as Noah Thompson in the "Let's Get Invisible!" episode of Goosebumps.

His career received a major boost when he won the role of Josh Framm in Air Bud (1997), a film about a lonely boy who befriends a basketball-playing dog. Air Bud launched a franchise, with four sequels. Zegers appeared in four of the films, as well as a similar title, MVP: Most Valuable Primate (2000), which featured a hockey-playing chimp.

Around that time, he starred in other family-friendly fare, including A Call To Remember (1997) with Joe Mantegna, Nico the Unicorn (1998) with Elisha Cuthbert, Treasure Island (1999) with Jack Palance, and Time Share (2000) with Nastassja Kinski. He also played a boy who discovers he is a clone in the TV series So Weird (1999). While also headlining numerous family/animal films, between 1997 and 2004, Zegers had starring or costarring roles in many low-budget horror films, often Canadian, including Shadow Builder, Komodo (1999), Wrong Turn (2003), and Fear of the Dark and The Hollow (both 2004).

In Four Days (1999), Zegers played a nameless boy devoted to his bank-robber father. He also appeared in the short-lived American television series Titans (2000), opposite Yasmine Bleeth, for which he was chosen by producer Aaron Spelling. It was his first regular television series role. Zegers had previously worked with Bleeth in the 1999 film It Came from the Sky, where he played a mentally disabled child visited by an angel-like couple. He co-starred with Harry Hamlin in Sex, Lies & Obsession (2001), a Lifetime Network film about sex addiction, and with Gena Rowlands and James Caan in The Incredible Mrs. Ritchie (2003), a television film drama that won three Daytime Emmy awards: Outstanding Children/Youth/Family Special, Outstanding Performer (Rowlands), and Outstanding Writing.

In the summer of 2003, he filmed the drama Some Things That Stay at the same time as the remake of Dawn of the Dead, shuttling across Canada between sets. Around this time, he also continued his television work, appearing on Smallville in 2003 and House in 2004.

2005–present
In 2005, he had a major role in the Academy Award-nominated independent film Transamerica, co-starring Felicity Huffman. Zegers' performance as Toby Osbourne, the street-hustling bisexual son of a trans woman (Huffman) was praised by several critics, and he won the Trophée Chopard for Male Revelation at the 2006 Cannes Film Festival. Director Duncan Tucker said he had to overcome his initial wariness over Zegers' good looks before casting him for the role. Varietys reviewer wrote that "Zegers... finds multiple dimensions in pic's potentially most clichéd character...," and The Hollywood Reporters critic said, "As a boy who considers sex his chief talent, Zegers... conveys Toby's essential sweetness and hunger for real affection, making him much more than just a vain or damaged kid."

Also in 2005, he appeared with Shailene Woodley in Felicity: An American Girl Adventure, a television film set in Williamsburg, Virginia, in 1775, based on the American Girl book series. He played 15-year-old Benjamin "Ben" Davidson, an apprentice at a shop owned by Felicity's father. In 2006, Zegers played supervillain Concussion in the comedy Zoom, with Tim Allen, and had the lead role opposite Samaire Armstrong in the romantic comedy It's a Boy Girl Thing. He guest-starred as Damien Dalgaard in Gossip Girl from 2009 until 2010, and returned again in late 2010 for multiple episodes throughout season 4. He appeared in Rock Mafia's 2010 music video "The Big Bang", and in 2012, played the male protagonist in the television series Titanic: Blood and Steel.

Zegers portrayed Alec Lightwood in The Mortal Instruments: City of Bones (2013). He joined the cast of Fear the Walking Dead for the series' fourth season.

Personal life
In August 2013, Zegers married Jaime Feld, a talent agent. The couple had twin girls in August 2015.

Filmography

Film

Television

Music video

Awards

References

External links

 

1984 births
20th-century Canadian male actors
21st-century Canadian male actors
Canadian male child actors
Canadian male film actors
Canadian male models
Canadian male television actors
Canadian male voice actors
Canadian people of Dutch descent
Living people
Male actors from Ontario
People from Woodstock, Ontario
Chopard Trophy for Male Revelation winners